Jim Tshimpaka Kadima (born 17 August 1977 in Lubumbashi) is a basketball player from the Democratic Republic of the Congo. He represented DR Congo at the 2007 FIBA Africa Championship, where he scored 34 points in 81 minutes over 4 games.

References

1977 births
Living people
People from Lubumbashi
Democratic Republic of the Congo men's basketball players
21st-century Democratic Republic of the Congo people